The women's 48 kg competition of the weightlifting events at the 2013 Mediterranean Games in Mersin, Turkey, was held on June 21 at the Erdemli Sports Hall.

Each lifter performed in both the snatch and clean and jerk lifts, with the final score being the sum of the lifter's best result in each. The athlete received three attempts in each of the two lifts; the score for the lift was the heaviest weight successfully lifted. This weightlifting event was the lightest men's event at the weightlifting competition, limiting competitors to a maximum of 48 kilograms of body mass.

Schedule
All times are Eastern European Summer Time (UTC+3).

Results
5 athletes from five countries will take part.

Snatch

Clean & Jerk

References

Weightlifting at the 2013 Mediterranean Games